Angling Spring Wood is in Great Missenden, Buckinghamshire, England with an area of . It is owned by Chiltern District Council. The woodland is located close to Gipsy House, the former residence of Roald Dahl. The author regularly walked in the woods, gaining inspiration to write Danny, the Champion of the World and Fantastic Mr Fox.

References

Great Missenden
Forests and woodlands of Buckinghamshire
Roald Dahl